The Brainerd-Little Falls Muskies were a minor league baseball team that played for one season, 1934, in the Northern League. They represented the cities of Brainerd, Minnesota and Little Falls, Minnesota. They played their home games at Bane Park in Brainerd.

Under manager Charlie Patton, they went 58-58 in their only season of existence, good for fourth in the league.

References

Baseball teams established in 1934
Baseball teams disestablished in 1934
1934 establishments in Minnesota
1934 disestablishments in Minnesota
Defunct minor league baseball teams
Northern League (1902-71) baseball teams
Defunct baseball teams in Minnesota